San Pietro al Tanagro is a village and comune in the province of Salerno in the Campania region of south-west Italy.

Geography
San Pietro al Tanagro is 90 kilometers far from Salerno. It has a population of 1,640 inhabitants and a surface of 15,3 square kilometers thus showing a population density of 107,19 inhabitants per square kilometer. It rises 450 metres above the sea level.

The Town Hall is located in Via De Cusatis, phone (+39) 0975 399326, fax (+39) 0975 399326.

The municipality is bordered by Atena Lucana, Corleto Monforte, San Rufo, Sant'Arsenio and Teggiano.

Notes and references

See also
Vallo di Diano
Alburni

External links

Cities and towns in Campania
Localities of Cilento